Fiammingo was a name given by Italians to (mainly) Flemish painters, and may refer to:

Arrigo Fiammingo, real name Hendrick van den Broeck
Cornelio Fiammingo, real name Cornelis Cort
Enrico Fiammingo, real name Hendrick de Somer
Giovanni Fiammingo, real name Jan van Calcar
Guglielmo Fiammingo, real name Willem Danielsz van Tetrode
Il Fiammingo may refer to François Duquesnoy or to Denis Calvaert
Michele Fiammingo, real name Michele Desubleo
Rinaldo Fiammingo, real name Aert Mijtens